The women's triple jump at the 2014 European Athletics Championships took place at the Letzigrund on 13 and 16 August.

Medalists

Records

Schedule

Results

Qualification

14.20 m (Q) or at least 12 best performers (q) advance to the Final.

Final

References

Triple Jump W
Triple jump at the European Athletics Championships
2014 in women's athletics